South Dakota Highway 52 (SD 52) is a state route that runs just north of the Missouri River, across southeast South Dakota. It begins at a junction with South Dakota Highway 37 north of Springfield, and terminates in Yankton at U.S. Highway 81, at the junction of 4th and Broadway Streets.

History
This is the third occurrence of the use of South Dakota 52 since 1926.

The first SD 52 was located in the southwest portion of the state, designated in the mid-1920s.  It extended from Oelrichs east to Oglala.  It was used until 1950, when U.S. Highway 18 was rerouted onto this road.

In the early 1950s, there were two new, separate segments of SD 52.  One was in the extreme southwest corner of the state.  It began at U.S. 18 in Edgemont, and ran southerly to meet what is now South Dakota Highway 71 near Rumford.  This road was renumbered as South Dakota Highway 471 in 1976.

The second 1950's segment of SD 52 was the current alignment.

Major intersections

References

External links

South Dakota Highways Page: Highways 31-60

052
Transportation in Bon Homme County, South Dakota
Transportation in Yankton County, South Dakota